The Players Choice Awards are annual Major League Baseball awards, given by the Major League Baseball Players Association (MLBPA).

The Players Choice Awards are given following a secret ballot by players. Four awards go to a player in each league, while two awards each go to one player in all of Major League Baseball. Prize money is donated to a charity of each winner's choice.

The first Players Choice Awards were given in 1992, to the Comeback Player in each of the two major leagues. There were no other awards that year. In 1993, the Comeback Player awards were replaced by an Outstanding Player award for each league. Then, in 1994, two more categories were added: Outstanding Pitcher (in each league) and Outstanding Rookie (in each league).

In 1997, the dual Comeback Player awards were again named, along with the first-ever single award – the Man of the Year – for one player in all of Major League Baseball. In 1998, a second non-dual award was added, Player of the Year. In addition, the Man of the Year award was renamed in honor of Marvin Miller, former executive director of the Major League Baseball Players Association. In 1999, a special Player of the Decade award was given.

In 2015, a third non-dual award was created. The "Always Game" award is given to the player who – game in and game out – constantly exhibits positive energy, grit, tenacity, hustle, perseverance, relentlessness and sportsmanship; all for the benefit of his teammates and fans.

Awards for one player in all of Major League Baseball

Player of the Year

This award was first given in 1998.

The Marvin Miller Man of the Year Award

This award is given to "the player in either league whose on-field performance and contributions to his community inspire others to higher levels of achievement." First given in 1997 (as the "Man of the Year" Award), it was renamed in 1998 in honor of Marvin Miller, former executive director of the Major League Baseball Players Association.

Curt Flood Award
First handed out in 2020, this award is given to a former player, living or deceased, who in the image of Curt Flood demonstrated a selfless, longtime devotion to the Players Association and advancement of Players’ rights.

Majestic Athletic Always Game Award 
This award was first given in 2015. The award was not included in the list of 2018 winners.

Awards for a player in each league

Outstanding Player
First awarded in 1993.

Outstanding Pitcher
First awarded in 1994.

Outstanding Rookie
First awarded in 1994.

Comeback Player

In 1992, this was the first ever Players Choice Award. There were no other awards that year. The Comeback Player award was not given from 1993 to 1996, although awards were given in other categories. In 1997, it was again awarded and has been ever since.

Award for Player of the Decade

In 1999, a special Player of the Decade award was given to Ken Griffey Jr.

See also
Baseball America Major League Player of the Year (in MLB; for all positions)
Best Major League Baseball Player ESPY Award (in MLB; for all positions)
Sporting News Player of the Year Award (in MLB; for all positions) (Sporting News also has a Pitcher of the Year award for each league)
The Sporting News Most Valuable Player Award (in each league) (discontinued in 1946)
Baseball Digest Player of the Year (in MLB; for position players) (from 1969 to 1993, included all positions; in 1994, a separate Pitcher of the Year award was added)
"Esurance MLB Awards" Best Major Leaguer (in MLB; for all positions) (there are also awards for Best Hitter and Best Pitcher)
Kenesaw Mountain Landis Most Valuable Player Award (in each league; for all positions) (MLB also has the Cy Young Award for a pitcher in each league)
Triple Crown (baseball)
MLB All-Century Team
MLB All-Time Team (Baseball Writers' Association of America)
Baseball awards
List of MLB awards

References

External links

Major League Baseball trophies and awards
Awards established in 1992